Marus was a  Palestinian village in Upper Galilee, 7 km northeast of Safad. In the Roman and medieval period it had Jewish population, and by the 16th century it became entirely Muslim. After a period of desertion, it was resettled by Algerian Arabs. It was depopulated in 1948 during the Operation Hiram by the Israeli attacking brigade Sheva' Brigade.

History

Archaeology
In 1875, Victor Guérin found  major ruins here. He described the place as a destroyed Arab village.

In 1881  the PEF's Survey of Western Palestine found here: "Modern and ancient ruins; a spring in a rock-cut cave, ancient foundations of good-sized stones; the foundations of a small rectangular building to the west of the eastern portion of the ruin. Some rock-cut tombs and many caves in hills around."

Starting in 1981 Zvi Ilan excavated in sites next to the 20th century village in different directions. Excavations revealed signs of a long-standing community, and Jewish presence at some periods. An ancient synagogue built in the late 4th or early 5th century, and a related Beth midrash of the 7th century, a cache of coins ranging from the 5th to 9th centuries, a necropolis partly of the 1st century CE, and sherds from Roman to early Ottoman period. There are remains of a defensive wall of large stones, and a hewn moat.

Written sources

Classic era
Based on the archaeological findings and the name Marus, archaeologist Zvi Ilan suggested Marus is to be identified with the town Meroth. Meroth is mentioned by Josephus as a border town between Jewish Galilee and Tyre in the First Jewish–Roman War, and a place fortified early in the war. Previous suggestions as to its location included Maroun al-Ras, and Meiron, which show less archaeological parallels.

Middle ages
Marus is probably mentioned in a Samaritan medieval manuscript, again as the border of Tyre, and in a pilgrimage guide of the 14th century.

Ottoman era
In 1596, Marus  was part of the Ottoman Empire, a village in the nahiya (subdistrict) of Jira under the liwa' ("district") of Safad, with a population of 176. It paid taxes on a number of crops, including wheat, barley, and fruits as well as on goats. All the villagers were Muslim.

In the second half of the 19th century Algerian followers of Abdelkader El Djezairi have been defeated by the French in Algeria, and sought refuge in another part of the Ottoman Empire. They were given lands in various locations in Ottoman Syria, including Marus, and the close by Dayshum, Ammuqa, Al-Husayniyya and Tulayl.

British Mandate era
In the British mandate period the village was classified  as a hamlet by the Palestine Index Gazetteer. In the 1922 census of Palestine, Marus had a population of 45; all Muslims,  increasing in the 1931 census to 59, still all  Muslims,  in  a total of 12  houses.

In the 1945 statistics, the population was 80 Muslims, and the total land area was 3,183 dunums.  Of this,  108 dunums were  plantations and irrigable land, 903 used for cereals, while 8 dunams were built-up (urban) land.

Israeli rule
The village  was occupied  by the Israeli Defense Force's Sheva' Brigade, during the Operation Hiram at the close of 1948 Arab-Israeli war.

According to the Palestinian historian Walid Khalidi, describing the  village land in 1992: "The site contains some olive and fig trees as well as stones from ruined homes. The surrounding land is used for grazing."

See also
Depopulated Palestinian locations in Israel

References

Bibliography

External links
Welcome to Marus Palestine Remembered
Marus, Zochrot
Marus,  Dr. Khalil Rizk.
Survey of Western Palestine, Map 4: IAA, Wikimedia commons 
Marus, from the Khalil Sakakini Cultural Center

Arab villages depopulated during the 1948 Arab–Israeli War
District of Safad
19th-century establishments in Ottoman Syria
1948 disestablishments in Israel